John Traherne Moggridge (8 March 1842 – 24 November 1874) was a British botanist, entomologist, and arachnologist. A Fellow of the Linnean Society of London, he was known as a keen naturalist with great observational skills, as well as his paintings and illustrations. He wrote several articles on the fertilisation of plants, and his paintings of plants of southern France appeared in Contributions to the Flora of Mentone. His two volume study, Harvesting Ants and Trap-door Spiders, among other observations, confirmed that harvester ants are present in Europe, and was one of the first comprehensive treatments of the burrowing behaviour of trapdoor spiders. He was a correspondent of Charles Darwin, who cited his work in his books Fertilisation of Orchids and  The Descent of Man, and Selection in Relation to Sex.

Moggridge was born in Swansea, Wales to a family already steeped in natural history.  His father, Matthew Moggridge, was a naturalist and geologist, a Fellow of the Linnean, Geological and Zoological Societies, while his mother, Fanny Moggridge, was the daughter of Lewis Weston Dillwyn, a naturalist and member of parliament. John attended King's School, Sherborne (now known as Sherborne School) in Dorset and in 1861 enrolled in Trinity College, Cambridge, but health problems interrupted his studies, causing him to relocate to the warmer climate of Menton, France, in the Provence region of southern France.

He died in Menton of tuberculosis in 1874 at the age of 32, following a lengthy period of invalidity. He was posthumously commemorated in the genus name Moggridgea, a group of spiders named by Octavius Pickard-Cambridge, who also named a species of nemesiid spider (Nemesia moggridgii, now N. carminans) after Moggridge.


Books
 Contributions to the Flora of Mentone.  London: Lovell Reeve & Co. 1864
 Harvesting Ants and Trap-door Spiders. London: Lovell Reeve & Co. 1873
 Supplement to Harvesting Ants and Trap-door Spiders. London: Lovell Reeve & Co. 1874
 Contributions to the Flora of Mentone and to a Winter Flora of the Riviera, including the coast from Marseilles to Genoa 1874

Illustrations

References

External links

1842 births
1874 deaths
British botanists
British entomologists
Fellows of the Linnean Society of London
British arachnologists
19th-century deaths from tuberculosis
Alumni of Trinity College, Cambridge
People from Swansea
People educated at Sherborne School
Tuberculosis deaths in France